Theodore Vincent Bibb (1918 – 2010), was an American jazz drummer. He was one of a number of St. Louis musicians who served in the military during the World War II era.  "During his music career he performed with Dewey Jackson, “Peanuts” Whalum, Oliver Nelson, the George Hudson Orchestra, and Singleton Palmer." Bibb died on November 21, 2010, at the age of 92.

Early life
Bibb served in the United States Army where he rose to the rank of Technician fifth grade.

References

External links

1918 births
2010 deaths
Musicians from St. Louis
American jazz drummers
United States Army non-commissioned officers
United States Army personnel of World War II